The Crystal and the Amulet is a novel by James Cawthorn published in 1986.

Plot summary
The Crystal and the Amulet is a pictorial adaptation of the Hawkmoon "Runestaff" tetralogy drawn in black-and-white.

Reception
Dave Langford reviewed The Crystal and the Amulet for White Dwarf #81, and stated that "With flints of humour amid the horror, too, as witness the unfortunate slave suffering the consequences of playing Call of Cthulhu is the background of one sequence."

References

1986 novels